The 19th season of Law & Order premiered on NBC on November 5, 2008, and concluded on June 3, 2009. This was the third time in the series where there were no changes in the cast from the previous season and the last season to air on Wednesday nights at 10PM/9c, Law & Order: Special Victims Unit has claimed the slot off-and-on (SVU often placed at 9PM/8c to lead other programming that later gets moved or taken off schedule) from Fall 2009 to present.

The series declined in the ratings due to competition from CBS's CSI: NY although some episodes spiked when CSI: NY episodes were repeats (or replaced with other programming).

Cast

Main cast
 Jeremy Sisto as Senior Detective Cyrus Lupo
 Anthony Anderson as Junior Detective Kevin Bernard
 S. Epatha Merkerson as Lieutenant Anita Van Buren
 Linus Roache as Executive Assistant District Attorney Michael Cutter
 Alana de la Garza as Assistant District Attorney Connie Rubirosa
 Sam Waterston as Interim District Attorney  Jack McCoy

Recurring cast
 Carolyn McCormick as Dr. Elizabeth Olivet

Episodes

References

External links
Episode guide from NBC.com

19
2008 American television seasons
2009 American television seasons